The 2019 Danish Darts Open was the eighth of thirteen PDC European Tour events on the 2019 PDC Pro Tour. The tournament took place at Brøndbyhallen, Copenhagen, Denmark, from 14–16 June 2019. It featured a field of 48 players and £140,000 in prize money, with £25,000 going to the winner.

Mensur Suljović was the defending champion after defeating Simon Whitlock 8–3 in the final of the 2018 tournament, but he lost 6–5 to Dave Chisnall in the third round.

Chisnall would go on to win the event, his second European Tour title and his first for 6 years, by defeating Chris Dobey 8–3 in the final.

Prize money
This is how the prize money is divided:

 Seeded players who lose in the second round do not receive this prize money on any Orders of Merit.

Qualification and format
The top 16 entrants from the PDC ProTour Order of Merit on 7 May will automatically qualify for the event and will be seeded in the second round.

The remaining 32 places will go to players from six qualifying events – 18 from the UK Tour Card Holder Qualifier (held on 17 May), six from the European Tour Card Holder Qualifier (held on 17 May), two from the West & South European Associate Member Qualifier (held on 18 May), two from the Host Nation Qualifier (held on 13 June), two from the Nordic & Baltic Qualifier (excluding Danish players, held on 10 March), one from the East European Qualifier (held on 10 March), and one to the highest ranked PDCNB player on the PDC Order of Merit without a Tour Card.

From 2019, the Host Nation, Nordic & Baltic and East European Qualifiers will only be available to non-Tour Card holders. Any Tour Card holders from the applicable regions will have to play the main European Qualifier.

The following players will take part in the tournament:

Top 16
  Ian White (third round)
  Daryl Gurney (third round)
  Gerwyn Price (semi-finals)
  James Wade (third round)
  Adrian Lewis (third round)
  Peter Wright (third round)
  Rob Cross (second round)
  Mensur Suljović (third round)
  Dave Chisnall (champion)
  Ricky Evans (second round)
  Joe Cullen (quarter-finals)
  Simon Whitlock (quarter-finals)
  Jonny Clayton (semi-finals)
  Stephen Bunting (third round)
  Darren Webster (second round)
  Jermaine Wattimena (quarter-finals)

UK Qualifier
  Steve Beaton (first round)
  Michael Smith (second round)
  Nathan Aspinall (second round)
  Mervyn King (first round)
  Kirk Shepherd (third round)
  Steve West (first round)
  Kevin Burness (second round)
  Chris Dobey (runner-up)
  Reece Robinson (first round)
  Mick Todd (first round)
  Glen Durrant (first round)
  Ryan Harrington (second round)
 
  Luke Woodhouse (first round)
  Kyle Anderson (second round)
  
  Steve Lennon (first round)
  Ryan Joyce (second round)

European Qualifier
  Martin Schindler (second round)
  Krzysztof Ratajski (second round)
  José Justicia (first round)
  José de Sousa (quarter-finals)
  Gabriel Clemens (second round)
  Vincent van der Voort (first round)

West/South European Qualifier
  Mike De Decker (first round)
  Cody Harris (second round)

Host Nation Qualifier
  Per Laursen (second round)
  Niels-Jørgen Hansen (first round)

Nordic & Baltic Qualifier
  Dennis Nilsson (second round)
  Teuvo Haverinen (first round)

Highest Ranked PDCNB Player on the PDC Order of Merit without a Tour Card
  Kim Viljanen (first round)

East European Qualifier
  Krzysztof Kciuk (first round)

Draw

References

2019 PDC Pro Tour
2019 PDC European Tour
2019 in Danish sport
June 2019 sports events in Europe